Christopher Leroy Ramsey  (born 28 April 1962) is a former professional footballer who is currently technical director at Queens Park Rangers. He played as a defender, most often as a right back, for Bristol City, Brighton & Hove Albion, Swindon Town, Southend United, Naxxar Lions and Cocoa Expos. Ramsey coached for Tottenham Hotspur working with their academy and was appointed as first team coach where he assisted Tim Sherwood and Les Ferdinand. He was placed in temporary charge of Queens Park Rangers, in February 2015 following the resignation of manager, Harry Redknapp. After being temporary coach of Queens Park Rangers and following their relegation to the Championship, Ramsey was named head coach on a permanent basis in May 2015. He is nicknamed "Rambo".

He was appointed Member of the Order of the British Empire (MBE) in the 2019 Birthday Honours for services to football and diversity in sport.

Playing career
He began his career as an apprentice at Bristol City before moving on to Brighton and Hove Albion. He played for Brighton in the 1983 FA Cup Final. The opponents were Manchester United. With Brighton leading, Ramsey was injured by a bad tackle from Norman Whiteside and was still hobbling as Frank Stapleton got ahead of him to equalise for United. Moments later Ramsey received further treatment for his injury and was promptly substituted. After a drawn final at Wembley, Ramsey missed the replay due to the injury and Brighton lost 4–0.

Ramsey went on loan to Swindon Town from Brighton on 30 August 1984, who were then under the management of Lou Macari. He signed on a permanent contract on 13 December 1984 and stayed at Swindon for three years until joining Southend United on 14 August 1987.
Whilst at Swindon he won a Fourth Division championship medal in the 85–86 Swindon team, playing 43 of the 46 league games. He also played 25 games the following season when Swindon won back-to-back promotions by beating Gillingham in the Third Division play-off final replay at Selhurst Park on 29 May 1987.

Coaching career
Ramsey was also a player-coach for the Naxxar Lions in the Maltese Premier League, and in the United States was a player, assistant coach and coach for the USL PDL team Cocoa Expos.

In 1998 Ramsey began working for the Football Association (FA), holding the position of Regional Director of Coaching. While working for the FA he served as the head coach of the England national under-20 football team. During his tenure as the U-20 coach, Ramsey guided the team to the 1999 FIFA World Youth Championship in Nigeria. He was also the assistant coach of the England national under-16 football team at the 2000 UEFA European Under-16 Football Championship in Israel. In addition to his coaching responsibilities while at the FA, Ramsey was a scout for the England national football team under Kevin Keegan. After leaving the FA Ramsey was the assistant coach at Luton Town until November 2000. Ramsey holds a UEFA coaching licence and a FA Coach Education Diploma.

From 2001 to 2004 he managed American club Charleston Battery, during which time the club won the 2003 USL A-League championship. After leaving Charleston in 2004, Ramsey worked as Head of Player Development with the Tottenham Hotspur F.C. Reserves and Academy. In 2008, he was listed amongst the 30 most influential black people in football by The Voice, a newspaper for the black community.

Ramsey left Tottenham Hotspur on 19 June 2014, following ten years of service to the club.

In August 2014, he was appointed as assistant manager of the England U17 national team.

Queens Park Rangers
On 1 November 2014, he was appointed Head of Player Development and Academy Manager at Queens Park Rangers. Following the resignation of manager Harry Redknapp on 3 February 2015, Ramsey was placed in temporary charge, first with Les Ferdinand and Kevin Bond, then solely with Bond. Ramsey's first competitive match as QPR head coach was on 7 February, losing to a 92nd minute, added-time winner, a 1–0 defeat to Southampton at Loftus Road. His first Premier League win came three days later, on 10 February, a 0–2 victory against Sunderland at the Stadium of Light, in QPR's first away victory and first away points of the season. On 12 February, Ramsey was given the job until the end of the 2014–15 season. On 10 May, QPR were relegated to the Championship, after a 6–0 away defeat to Manchester City. He was appointed head coach on a permanent basis on 19 May, signing a three-year contract. On 4 November, he was sacked as QPR head coach, with the club in thirteenth place in the league. On 5 January 2016, Ramsey returned to QPR to become technical director.

Career statistics

Player

<div>

Manager

Honours

Player
Brighton
FA Cup Runner-up (1): 1983 FA Cup Final

Swindon Town
Fourth Division Champions (1): 1985–86
Third Division Play-offs Winners (1): 1986–87

References

External links
Chris Ramsey player profile at http://www.swindon-town-fc.co.uk/

1962 births
Living people
Bristol City F.C. players
Brighton & Hove Albion F.C. players
Swindon Town F.C. players
Southend United F.C. players
Black British sportsmen
English Football League players
English expatriate footballers
Expatriate footballers in Malta
Expatriate soccer players in the United States
English football managers
United Soccer League (1984–85) players
Luton Town F.C. non-playing staff
Tottenham Hotspur F.C. non-playing staff
Association football defenders
Cocoa Expos players
Naxxar Lions F.C. players
Queens Park Rangers F.C. managers
Queens Park Rangers F.C. non-playing staff
English footballers
Premier League managers
Charleston Battery coaches
English expatriate sportspeople in the United States
Members of the Order of the British Empire
FA Cup Final players